The Chestnut Man (Danish: Kastanjemanden) is a Danish crime series released on Netflix on 29 September 2021. The series was created by Dorte Warnøe Hagh, David Sandreuter, and Mikkel Serup, is directed by Kasper Barfoed and Mikkel Serup, and is based on the book of the same name by Søren Sveistrup. The series stars Danica Curcic and Mikkel Boe Følsgaard as Naia Thulin and Mark Hess, who investigate the murders of several women involving a mysterious chestnut figurine left at the crime scenes.

Synopsis
The Chestnut Man opens with the discovery of the murder of an entire family on an isolated farm in 1987. More than thirty years later, in present-day Copenhagen, a young woman is found murdered in a playground with one of her hands missing. Detective Naia Thulin is assigned to the case. With her reluctant new partner, Mark Hess, they notice a tiny figurine made of chestnuts lying next to the body. A mysterious piece of evidence is soon discovered on the chestnut man—the fingerprint of a missing girl, the daughter of politician Rosa Hartung.

Cast and characters
 Danica Curcic as Naia Thulin, an investigator with the Copenhagen police
 Mikkel Boe Følsgaard as Mark Hess, an investigator from Europol who temporarily returns to Copenhagen.
 David Dencik as Simon Genz, a forensics worker with the Copenhagen police
 Lars Ranthe as Nylander, Thulin's boss
 Iben Dorner as Rosa Hartung, the Danish Minister of Social Affairs, whose daughter Kristine has disappeared.
 Esben Dalgaard Anderssen as Steen Hartung, Rosa's husband
 Liva Forsberg as Le Thulin
 Louis Næss-Schmidt as Gustav Hartung
 Ali Kazim as Nehru

Episodes

Development
On 19 August 2019, Netflix announced its second Danish series at the Copenhagen TV Festival. The Chestnut Man is based on the debut novel by award-winning writer Søren Sveistrup (The Killing) and the series debuted on Netflix worldwide.

Reception
The Chestnut Man received generally favourable views from critics and holds a 100% rating on Rotten Tomatoes, based on six critic reviews. Critics have described the show as "gripping" and "gruesome", while others, like Verdens Gang, described it as a "perfected cliche", while also giving it a four out of six on a dice roll.

References

External links
 
 

Danish-language Netflix original programming
2021 Danish television series debuts
Danish crime television series
Danish drama television series